Sollia is a former municipality in Hedmark county, Norway.  The  municipality existed from 1864 until its dissolution in 1965. Since then, it has made up the northern part of the present-day Stor-Elvdal Municipality. The administrative centre of the municipality was the village of Sollia where Sollia Church is located.

Name
The first element is sol which means "the Sun" and the last element is the finite form of li which means "hillside". Thus, the name means "the sunny hillside".

History
The parish of Solliden (population: 386) was established as a municipality on 1 January 1864 when it was separated from Ringebu Municipality. The new municipality was originally part of Kristians amt (county) when it was established. On 1 January 1891, the municipality of Solliden was transferred to the neighboring county: Hedemarkens amt. An uninhabited part of Ringebu was moved to Solliden on 1 January 1899. On 18 November 1921, the name of the municipality was officially changed from Solliden to Sollia. During the 1960s, there were many municipal mergers across Norway due to the work of the Schei Committee. On 1 January 1965, Sollia (population: 356) was merged into the neighboring municipality of Stor-Elvdal (population: 3,808).

Government

The municipal council  of Sollia was made up of representatives that were elected to four year terms.  The party breakdown of the final municipal council was as follows:

See also
List of former municipalities of Norway

References

Stor-Elvdal
Former municipalities of Norway
1864 establishments in Norway
1965 disestablishments in Norway